Elections for the Philippine Legislature were held on June 3, 1919, pursuant to the Philippine Organic Act of 1902  which prescribed elections for every three years. Voters elected all 90 members of the House of Representatives in the 1919 Philippine House of Representatives elections; and all 22 members of the Senate in the 1919 Philippine Senate elections.

1919
1919 elections in Asia
1919 in the Philippines